Colwellia aquaemaris is a Gram-negative, heterotrophic and facultatively anaerobic bacterium from the genus of Colwellia which has been isolated from the fish Cynoglossus semilaevis from a recirculating mariculture system in Tianjin in China.

References

Alteromonadales
Bacteria described in 2014